Rafig Hajiyev (born 1946) is a retired Soviet freestyle wrestler of Azerbaijani origin. He held the Soviet and European titles in 1970, and won silver medals at the 1973 European and 1974 world championships. He retired from competitions in 1976 and then had a long career as a police officer, reaching the rank of colonel. He remained active in wrestling as a coach.

References

External links
 

1946 births
Living people
Soviet male sport wrestlers
Azerbaijani male sport wrestlers
Sportspeople from Baku
World Wrestling Championships medalists
European Wrestling Championships medalists